Ledsham is a village and civil parish in the unitary authority of Cheshire West and Chester and the ceremonial county of Cheshire, England. The civil parish includes parts of the hamlets of Badger's Rake and Two Mills. 

At the 2011 Census, the village had a population of 181.

History
In 1085, Ledsham was recorded in the Domesday Book as Levetesham. The landowner was Walter de Vernon. The land passed by will from the Massey family to Sir Thomas Stanley of Hooton in 1715.

Formerly a township in Neston parish of the Wirral Hundred, it became a civil parish in 1866. The population was recorded at 56 in 1801, 94 in 1851, 82 in 1901, 116 in 1951 and 88 in 2001.

The village was served by Ledsham railway station on the former Chester and Birkenhead Railway. A local cottage had been used as the station building, until the provision of more substantial facilities.
At its height, Ledsham station had four platforms and was situated at the southern end of the railway's quadrupled section.  The station never achieved the commercial potential expected by its owners, primarily due to its remote rural location.
Ledsham station closed completely on 20 July 1959.
However, two tracks of the line are still part of the Merseyrail network.

Governance
Ledsham is within the Ellesmere Port and Neston parliamentary constituency.

Geography

Transport
To the north and west of Ledsham, the A550 Welsh Road connects the A41 and A540.  
 
The nearest station is Capenhurst railway station on Merseyrail's Wirral line, with services between Liverpool and Chester.

Landmarks
Inglewood is a Grade II listed building in Ledsham, which was built as a private house in 1909. As of  the building is the Inglewood Manor Hotel.

See also

Listed buildings in Ledsham, Cheshire

References

External links

Villages in Cheshire
Civil parishes in Cheshire